Cody Clark may refer to:

 Cody Clark (American football) (1882–1931), American football player
 Cody Clark (baseball) (born 1981), American baseball player